Rouverol is a surname: Notable people with the surname include:

 Aurania Rouverol (1886–1955), American writer
 Jean Rouverol (1916–2017), American author, actress and screenwriter